Expendable is a novel by James Alan Gardner.

Expendable may also refer to:

 "Expendable" (short story), a science fiction story by Philip K. Dick
 The Expendables (2010 film), an action film by David Callaham and Sylvester Stallone
 Millennium Soldier: Expendable, a video game
 Expendable launch system, a type of space launch system where the first stage or tank structure of a rocket is used only once.

See also
 The Expendables (disambiguation)